Richard Jackson Jr. (July 3, 1764April 18, 1838) was a U.S. Representative from Rhode Island.

Born in Providence in the Colony of Rhode Island and Providence Plantations, Jackson completed preparatory studies in the schools of Providence and Pomfret, Connecticut.
He entered the mercantile and cotton manufacturing businesses.
He served as president of the Washington Insurance Co., Providence, Rhode Island from 1800 to 1838.

Jackson was elected as a Federalist to the Tenth Congress to fill the vacancy caused by the death of Nehemiah Knight.
He was reelected to the Eleventh, Twelfth, and Thirteenth Congresses and served from November 11, 1808, to March 3, 1815.
He was not a candidate for renomination in 1814.
Jackson served on the board of trustees of Brown University  from 1809 to 1838.  He was elected a member of the American Antiquarian Society in 1815.
He died in Providence, Rhode Island, on April 18, 1838.

References

External links
 
 

|-

1764 births
1838 deaths
Federalist Party members of the United States House of Representatives from Rhode Island
Members of the American Antiquarian Society
Burials at North Burying Ground (Providence)
Politicians from Providence, Rhode Island